"Love's Comin' at Ya" is a song recorded and released by singer Melba Moore in 1982. Originally released on EMI America, it was also the first single released off her Capitol Records debut album, The Other Side of the Rainbow.

Served as a follow-up to her Kashif-produced hit, "Take My Love", "Love's Comin' At Ya" became an even bigger hit, produced by Kashif and Paul Lawrence Jones II, who also wrote the song, reaching No. 5 on the R&B chart, also reaching No. 2 on the Hot Dance Singles chart, and also became a hit overseas reaching number-fifteen in the United Kingdom, bringing the singer her best charted single in the country since "This Is It" seven years earlier. The song didn't chart on the Billboard Hot 100.

Personnel
Lead vocals: Melba Moore
Background vocals: Melba Moore, Alyson Williams, B.J. Nelson, Fonzi Thornton, Lillo Thomas, Freddie Jackson and Phillip Ballou
Drums: Leslie Ming
Guitar: Ira Siegel
Other instrumentation: Paul Lawrence Jones II and Kashif

Chart performance

References

1982 singles
Melba Moore songs
1982 songs
EMI America Records singles
Capitol Records singles
Songs written by Paul Laurence